Events in the year 1997 in Greece.

Incumbents

Events

 September 5 – The International Olympic Committee awards the 2004 Summer Olympics to the birthplace Athens (Greece). Athens beating Rome in the fifth and final round of votes 66 to 41.

Births

 June 12 – Ioanna Anagnostopoulou, rhythmic gymnast
 September 19 – Zoi Kontogianni, rhythmic gymnast

References

 
Years of the 20th century in Greece
Greece
1990s in Greece
Greece